Easley Mill is a historic mill complex in Easley, South Carolina.  The mill was the first of three built in Easley between 1899 and 1910.  The main building was completed in 1900, and is a four-story brick structure designed by preeminent mill architects Lockwood, Greene & Co.  It was built during a boom in the textile industry across the Southern United States; more than 70 mills were opened in South Carolina alone between 1895 and 1903.  The mill met with immediate success, including large shipments for export to China.  By 1907, the mill contained over 37,000 spindles and 1,000 looms, and employed 500.  It was sold to Woodside Mills of Greenville in 1920, and to Dan River, Inc. in 1956, who operated the mill until 1990.  The mill has a shallow-pitched hip roof with bracketed eaves.  Most of the arched window openings have been bricked over.  Other structures on the site include a one-story office building, a warehouse, smokestack, an ice house, water tower, and monument to the mill's founder, John Mattison Geer.  The mill was listed on the National Register of Historic Places in 2013. A proposal was made to convert the building to apartments in 2019.

References

National Register of Historic Places in Pickens County, South Carolina
Industrial buildings and structures on the National Register of Historic Places in South Carolina
Industrial buildings completed in 1900
Buildings and structures in Pickens County, South Carolina
Textile mills in South Carolina
Easley, South Carolina
Cotton mills in the United States